Macedonia Methodist Church is a historic Methodist church located at Coffeytown, near Vesuvius, Amherst County, Virginia.  It was built in 1896, and is a one-story, frame church building with vernacular Gothic Revival style influences.  It sits on a random rubble stone foundation and has a gable roof with front bell tower. The interior features original unpainted American chestnut beaded board paneling on the walls and ceiling.

It was added to the National Register of Historic Places in 2011.

References

United Methodist churches in Virginia
Churches completed in 1869
Carpenter Gothic church buildings in Virginia
Churches on the National Register of Historic Places in Virginia
National Register of Historic Places in Amherst County, Virginia